A number of ships were named Glückauf, including –

, the first oil tanker, built in 1886 and wrecked in the 1890s at Fire Island, New York
, a German cargo ship that sank in 1939
, a German cargo ship in service 1939–40

Ship names